The 1988–89 Rugby League Premiership was the 15th end of season Rugby League Premiership competition.

The winners were Widnes.

First round

Semi-finals

Final

References

1989 in English rugby league